Arnold Charles Ernest Hintjens (21 May 1949 – 23 April 2022), better known by his stage name Arno, was a Belgian singer. He was the frontman of TC Matic, one of the best-known Belgian bands of the 1980s. After the band split in 1986 he enjoyed a solo career.

Career
Arno sang in a mixture of English, French, Dutch and his native Ostend-Flemish dialect. For TC Matic, a band which achieved moderate artistic success throughout Europe, he wrote or co-wrote all the band's material, much of it together with guitarist and producer Jean-Marie Aerts. After going solo he released more than a dozen albums during a successful career. In 2002 he received the title "Chevalier des Arts et des Lettres" (Knight in the Arts and Literature) of the French government. A 2004 biography by Gilles Deleux was translated in Dutch as Een lach en een traan ("A Smile and a Tear").

In the Belgian film Camping Cosmos he played the homosexual lifeguard Harry who does not pay attention to Lolo Ferrari who is incarnating a caricature of Pamela Anderson.

At the beginning of 2020, Arno postponed his upcoming tour after being diagnosed with pancreatic cancer. Until the end of his Life hé was performing and recording music. Opex was his last record, recorded while he was very ill. He died from the disease on 23 April 2022, in Brussels, at the age of 72.

Discography

Solo
Arno (album) (1986)
Charlatan (1988)
Ratata (1990)
Tracks From The Story (1992)
Idiots Savants (1993)
Water (1994) with the Subrovnicks
À La Française (1995)
Live À La Française (1997)
Give Me The Gift (1997)
European Cow Boy (1999)
À Poil Commercial (1999)
Le Best Of (2000)
Arno Charles Ernest (2002)
Longbox (2002)
French Bazaar (2004)
Live in Brussels (2005)
Jus De Box (2007)
Covers Cocktail (2008) 
Brussld (2010)
Future Vintage (2012)
Le coffret essentiel (2014)
Human Incognito (2016)*'
Santeboutique (2019)
Vivre (2021)
Opex (2022) (His last album was posthumously released)

Freckleface
Freckleface (1972)

With Tjens Couter
Who Cares (1975)
Plat Du Jour (1978)
Singles 1975-1980 (1978)
If It Blows (Let It Blow) (CD compilation, 1991)

With TC Matic
TC Matic (1981)
L'Apache (1982)
Choco (1983)
Yé Yé (1985)
The Best Of (Ça Vient, Ça Vient, Change Pas Demain) (1986)
Compil Complet! (2000)
TC Matic - The Essential (2003)

As Charles
Charles Et Les Lulus (1991) with Roland Vancampenhout, Adriano Cominotto and Piet Jorens.
Charles and the White Trash European Blues Connection (1998)

Filmography 
1987: Skin (by Guido Henderickx) as Chico
1996: Camping Cosmos (by Jan Bucquoy) as Himself
1997: Alors voilà (by Michel Piccoli) as Himself
1999: Surveiller les tortues (Short, by Inès Rabadan) as André
2006: Komma (by Martine Doyen) as Peter De Wit / Lars Ericsson
2007: Ex Drummer (by Koen Mortier)
2007: Parade nuptiale (by Emma Perret)
2007: I Always Wanted to Be a Gangster (by Samuel Benchetrit) as Himself
2009: Petites vacances à Knokke-le-Zoute (TV Movie, by Yves Matthey) as Maurice
2014: Le goût des myrtilles (by Thomas De Thier) as Eric Dessart
2015: Prejudice (by Antoine Cuypers) as Alain (final film role)

Honours 

Knight in the French Order of Arts and Letters: 2002
Grand Prix du Disque for French Song (Charles Ernest): 2002
Honorary citizen of Brussels: 2017
Honorary citizen of Ostend: 2018
Music Industry Awards Lifetime Achievement Award: 2019
Ostend Film Festival Lifetime Achievement Award: 2022
Officer in the Belgian Order of the Crown: 2022

References

External links

 
Official website
 
Review of 'Brussld' (English)

1949 births
2022 deaths 
Deaths from pancreatic cancer 
Deaths from cancer in Belgium
People from Ostend
Belgian male singers
Belgian rock singers
French-language singers of Belgium
English-language singers from Belgium
Belgian male film actors
Belgian composers
Male composers
Belgian male musicians
20th-century Belgian male actors
21st-century Belgian male actors

Chevaliers of the Ordre des Arts et des Lettres
Officers of the Order of the Crown (Belgium)